Mohamed Al Taani Masjid is a mosque in the medieval Hamar Weyne district of Mogadishu.

Overview 
Close to Jama'a Xamar Weyne, the Mohamed Al Taani Masjid is a mosque with a Shirazi style writing on it Mihraab attests to its antiquity. According to 'Aydarus Sharif 'Ali in his book Bughyat al-amal fi tarikh al-sumal, in 604 AH a man named Mohamed Ali came from Egypt to Mogadishu and became the Governor of Mogadishu. During his rule the following mosques were built: Mohamed al-Awal (which translates to Mohamed the 1st) Mosque (which is the Jama'a Xamar Weyne according to the locals), Mohamed al-Taani (Mohamed the 2nd) Mosque and the last one being Arba' Rukun (of the four corners) Mosque. According to 'Aydarus the last of these mosques was completed in 667 AH (1269 AD), which was the Arba' Rukun mosque.

See also 
 'Adayga Mosque
 Arba'a Rukun Mosque
 Awooto Eeday
 Fakr ad-Din Mosque
 Jama'a Shingani, Shingani

References 

Buildings and structures in Mogadishu
Mosques in Somalia